Twin Creeks is an unincorporated community and census-designated place (CDP) in Missoula County, Montana, United States. It is in the eastern part of the county, on the north side of the Blackfoot River. Montana Highway 200 passes through the community, leading northeast  to Ovando and west  to Missoula. 

Twin Creeks was first listed as a CDP prior to the 2020 census.

Demographics

References 

Census-designated places in Missoula County, Montana
Census-designated places in Montana